The Naumburg Master (a notname;  or ) was an anonymous medieval stone sculptor. His works date to the middle of the 13th century, were executed over a career of more than thirty years, and are counted among the most important artworks of the European Middle Ages. 

The Naumburg Master very likely learned his craft in northern France in the heyday of the High Gothic style. He was active in the towns of Noyon, Amiens, and Reims around 1225, and later possibly came to Metz in the Holy Roman Empire. Around 1230 he worked on Mainz Cathedral, where he created the fragmentary rood screen, including a sandstone relief of Saint Martin that became known as the Bassenheim Horseman. 

Afterwards he traveled east along the Via Regia to the episcopal see of Naumburg, where the rebuilding of Naumburg Cathedral had started around 1210 and the Gothic west choir was added from about 1245-1250. Construction was likely finished by 1257, including the twelve monumental donor portraits that are considered his masterpieces, and it is from thence that his notname derives. Made of Grillenburg Sandstone, some of the sculptures are identified by name while others could not be assigned with certainty. The portraits of the main benefactors Margrave Eckard II of Meissen and his consort Uta von Ballenstedt as well as Margrave Herman I and his spouse Regelinda stand on both sides of the choir entrance.

Considering his characteristic style, the Naumburg Master is also identified as the creator of the founder figures in Meissen Cathedral and of the tomb slab of one knight Hermann von Hagen, the relative of a Naumburg canon, in Merseburg Cathedral. His art shaped the work of numerous masons all over Central Germany. He was thus a  decisive conveyor and pioneer of the ground-breaking innovations in architecture and sculpture of the late Hohenstaufen period in the 13th century.

Further reading 
 Wolfgang Hartmann: Vom Main zur Burg Trifels - vom Kloster Hirsau zum Naumburger Dom. Auf hochmittelalterlichen Spuren des fränkischen Adelsgeschlechts der Reginbodonen. Aschaffenburg 2004,  .
 Clemens Kosch: Hochmittelalterliche Sakralbauten in Naumburg, Schulpforte und Freyburg an der Unstrut, Architektur und Liturgie bis 1300. Verlag Schnell und Steiner, Regensburg 2011, .
Hartmut Krohm, Holger Kunde (ed.): Catalog of the 2011 exhibit Der Naumburger Meister. Bildhauer und Architekt im Europa der Kathedralen. 2 volumes. Michael Imhof Verlag, Petersberg 2011, .
 Holger Kunde: Der Westchor des Naumburger Doms und die Marienstiftskirche. Kritische Überlegungen zur Forschung. In: Enno Bünz, Matthias Werner (Ed.): Religiöse Bewegungen im Mittelalter. Festschrift für Matthias Werner zum 65. Geburtstag. Böhlau, Köln 2007, .
 Ernst Schubert: Der Naumburger Dom. With photographs by Janos Stekovics. Halle an der Saale 1997, .
 Gerhard Straehle: Der Naumburger Meister in der deutschen Kunstgeschichte. Einhundert Jahre deutsche Kunstgeschichtsschreibung 1886-1989. Munich/Heidelberg 2009, . (Dissertation at Ludwig-Maximilians-Universität Munich 2008.)
Gerhard Straehle: Der Naumburger Stifter-Zyklus und der Erschlagene im Westchor (Synodalchor) des Naumburger Doms. Verl. Langewiesche, Königstein 2011, .

External links 

Official site for the major 2011 exhibition devoted to his work.

Gothic sculptors
German sculptors
Anonymous artists
People from Naumburg (Saale)
13th-century German artists